André Fernando Cardoso Santos Martins (born 3 September 1984) is a Portuguese professional road racing cyclist, who currently rides for UCI Continental team . In 2018, he was suspended for four years – backdated to June 2017 – after failing a drugs test for erythropoietin (EPO).

Career
Born in Porto, Portugal, Cardoso resides in Andorra la Vella, Andorra and Gondomar, Portugal.

In September 2016,  announced that Cardoso would join them for the 2017 season with a role as a mountain domestique for Alberto Contador and Bauke Mollema. On 27 June 2017, the UCI announced Cardoso tested positive for Erythropoietin in an out-of-competition control nine days earlier and had been provisionally suspended. He was given a four-year ban in November 2018, backdated to June 2017.

Following the conclusion of his ban, Cardoso joined the  team for the remainder of the 2021 season, riding the Troféu Joaquim Agostinho and Volta a Portugal with the team. For the 2022 season, Cardoso will join the  team.

Major results

2006
 9th Overall Volta ao Algarve
2007
 1st Mountains classification Volta a Portugal
 1st Young rider classification GP Internacional Paredes Rota dos Móveis
2008
 5th Road race, National Road Championships
2009
 3rd Overall GP CTT Correios de Portugal
 7th Overall Volta a Portugal
 9th Overall Troféu Joaquim Agostinho
 9th Gran Premio de Llodio
2010
 4th Overall Tour of Bulgaria
 4th Subida al Naranco
 8th Overall Tour de Gironde
 9th Overall Volta a Portugal
2011
 2nd Overall Volta a Portugal
1st Stage 10
 6th Gran Premio de Llodio
 7th Overall Troféu Joaquim Agostinho
 10th Overall Tour of Bulgaria
2012
 1st Mountains classification Tour of Norway
 10th Overall Tour of Turkey
 10th Rogaland GP
2013
 4th Overall Vuelta a Asturias
 5th Overall Vuelta a Burgos
 6th Overall Tour of Norway
2014
 4th Road race, National Road Championships
 4th GP Miguel Induráin
2016
 10th Overall Tour de San Luis
2017
 7th Clássica Aldeias do Xisto

Grand Tour general classification results timeline

References

External links

Cycling Base: André Cardoso
Cannondale: André Cardoso

1984 births
Living people
Portuguese male cyclists
Sportspeople from Porto
Cyclists at the 2016 Summer Olympics
Olympic cyclists of Portugal
Portuguese sportspeople in doping cases
Portuguese expatriate sportspeople in the Philippines